The 2018 season is Djurgårdens IF's 118th in existence, their 63rd season in Allsvenskan and their 18th consecutive season in the league. They are competing in Allsvenskan and Svenska Cupen and qualified for the 2018–19 UEFA Europa League.

Squad

Out on loan

Transfers

Winter

In:

Out:

Summer

In:

Out:

Competitions

Allsvenskan

Results summary

Results by round

Results

League table

2017–18 Svenska Cupen

Group stage

Knockout stage

Final

2018–19 Svenska Cupen

Group Stages took place during the 2019 season.

UEFA Europa League

Qualifying round

Squad statistics

Appearances and goals

|-
|colspan="14"|Players away from Djurgårdens on loan:
|-
|colspan="14"|Players who left Djurgårdens during the season:

|}

Goal scorers

Disciplinary record

References

External links
Official Website

Djurgårdens IF Fotboll seasons
Djurgårdens IF season
Djurgården